Stephen J. Cox is an American lawyer who served as the United States Attorney for the Eastern District of Texas. He assumed office on June 1, 2020, after being appointed by U.S. Attorney General Bill Barr. Cox was appointed by the Court as U.S. Attorney on September 28, 2020, having received unanimous approval of the District Judges. As the chief federal law enforcement officer in EDTX, Cox supervised the prosecution of all federal crimes and the litigation of all civil matters in which the United States has an interest. As U.S. Attorney, Cox led a staff of over 120 prosecutors, civil litigators, and support personnel located in Beaumont, Plano, Tyler, Sherman, Lufkin, and Texarkana. He resigned on January 20, 2021.

Before being appointed as U.S. Attorney, Cox served as deputy associate attorney general and chief of staff within the department's Office of the Associate Attorney General.  In his role, Cox spearheaded numerous policy reforms relating to corporate enforcement and regulatory reform, as well as overseeing several department matters relating to financial fraud and healthcare fraud.  He also served as vice chair of the Deputy Attorney General's working group on corporate enforcement and accountability, and as executive director of the department's regulatory reform task force.

Previously, Cox served on the William H. Webster Commission on the FBI, Counterterrorism, Intelligence, and the Events of Fort Hood, and as a senior advisor to the Director of U.S. Immigration and Customs Enforcement.  Cox has also spent time in private practice, dealing with white collar investigations, ethics and compliance, and regulatory matters.

Cox has a B.S. degree from the Texas A&M University and J.D. degree from the University of Houston Law Center.  He is a member of the Texas and District of Columbia bars.

References

External links
 Meet the U.S. Attorney

Year of birth missing (living people)
Living people
21st-century American lawyers
Texas A&M University alumni
Texas lawyers
United States Attorneys for the Eastern District of Texas
University of Houston Law Center alumni